Capture the Saint is the title of a 1997 mystery novel by Burl Barer, featuring the character of Simon Templar, alias "The Saint" who was created by Leslie Charteris in 1928.

Along with a novelization of the 1997 film, The Saint, also written by Barer, these were the first original Simon Templar works published since 1983 and the first to not be based upon a television or film script since 1980. It was issued by The Saint Club, a worldwide fan club for the series which Charteris himself had established in 1936.

Capture the Saint was the 52nd Saint book published since 1928 and currently remains the final literary adventure of Simon Templar. According to the website The Saintly Bible, Ian Dickerson, who wrote the authorized biography of Leslie Charteris, was at one point working on a new Saint novel based upon a story idea by the late author. Son of the Saint would feature the return of Templar's longtime girlfriend Patricia Holm and feature their son. To date the book remains unpublished.

As of 2015, Capture the Saint is out of print, though an e-book version is available.

Story summary

Simon Templar finds himself up to his halo in murder, mayhem, and intrigue in this clever adventure set in Seattle, Washington where he is attending the premiere of the film adaptation of his novel The Pirate. It is, in some ways, a sequel to The Saint in New York, as the little girl whom he rescued in that story reappears here as an adult enlisting his aid to stop a predatory pedophile police officer preying on Seattle's homeless street kids. He is also approached to find the Treasure of Dolores Costello—a treasure about which the Saint is already well informed. Without giving away too many surprises, suffice it to say that The Saint is back full throttle with old friends making surprise appearances.

References

External links
 The Saint Club webpage on Capture the Saint, including an excerpt.

1997 novels
Simon Templar books
Novels set in Seattle
American novels adapted into films